This is a list of rivers in Guam, a (U.S. territory) in the western Pacific Ocean. The list is arranged alphabetically by the name of the river.

Agaga River
Agfayan River
Aguada River
Ajayan River
Alatgue River
Almagosa River
Aplacho River
Asalonso River
Asan River
Aslinget River
Asmafines River
Astaban River
Atantano River
Atate River
Big Guatali River
Bile River
Bolanos River
Bonya River
Bubulao River
Cetti River
Chagame River
Chaot River
Dante River
Fensol River
Fintasa River
Fonte River
Gaan River
Gautali River
Geus River
Hagåtña River
Ieygo River
Imong River
Inarajan River
La Sa Fua River
Laelae River
Laguan River
Laguas River
Laolao River
Liyog River
Lonfit River
Maagas River
Madofan River
Madog River
Maemong River
Mahlac River
Malaja River
Manell River
Manengon River
Masso River
Matgue River
Maulap River
Namo River
Nelansa River
Pago River
Pajon River
Pasamano River
Paulana River
Pauliluc River
Pigua River
Sadog Gago River
Sagge River
Sagua River
Salinas River
San Nicolas River
Sarasa River
Sasa River
Sella River
Sigua River
Sumay River
Suyafe River
Taguag River
Taleyfac River
Talisay River
Talofofo River
Tarzan River
Tenjo River
Tinago River
Tinechong River
Togcha River
Toguan River
Tolaeyuus River
Topony River
Ugum River
Umatac River
Yledigao River
Ylig River

See also
List of rivers in U.S. insular areas

+Guam
Rivers
 
Guam